Beaver Run may refer to:

Beaver Run (Bowman Creek), in Wyoming County, Pennsylvania
 Beaver Run (Neshannock Creek tributary), a stream in Mercer County, Pennsylvania
Beaver Run (Buffalo Creek), in Union County, Pennsylvania
Beaver Run (Catawissa Creek), in Columbia County, Pennsylvania
Beaver Run (Chillisquaque Creek), in Northumberland County and Montour County, Pennsylvania
Beaver Run (County Line Branch), in Northumberland County and Montour County, Pennsylvania
Beaver Run (Little Muncy Creek), in Sullivan County and Lycoming County, Pennsylvania
Beaver Run (Tohickon Creek), in Bucks County, Pennsylvania
Beaver Run (South Branch French Creek tributary), a stream in Erie County, Pennsylvania
Beaver Run (Walhonding River), in Coshocton County, Ohio

See also
Beaver Run Reservoir